Sayumi (written:  or  in hiragana) is a feminine Japanese given name. Notable people with the name include:

, Japanese television announcer
, Japanese singer, model and actress
, Japanese voice actress
, Japanese voice actress

Japanese feminine given names